Tear Gas Squad is a 1940 American drama film directed by Terry O. Morse and starring Dennis Morgan, John Payne and Gloria Dickson. The film was made under the working title of State Cop. It includes the song  I'm an Officer of the Law (M.K. Jerome, Jack Scholl).

Plot

Tommy McCabe (Dennis Morgan) is a cocky nightclub singer who gets his jollies out of making fun of the local police force. In fact, his act includes a parody of a policeman. This does not prove amusing to pretty Jerry Sullivan (Gloria Dickson), the daughter of a police lieutenant (Harry Shannon), nor to Jerry's flatfoot boyfriend Bill Morrissey (John Payne). Tommy falls in love with Jerry, but initially receives a cool reception from her father and brothers, who are also police officers.  Tommy's singing in the Sullivan parlor melts the hearts of everyone but Morissey. Due to his love for Jerry, Tommy joins the police force. Jealous, Morrissey subjects him to a rigorous training program beyond what is typical for cadets. Eventually suspended from the police because of his carelessness, Tommy ends up saving the day by saving Morrisey's life. Tommy is finally reinstated in the force, thus rewarding Jerry's faith in him.

Cast
 Dennis Morgan as Tommy McCabe
 John Payne as Bill Morrissey
 Gloria Dickson as Jerry Sullivan
 George Reeves as Joe McCabe
 Frank Wilcox as Sgt. Crump
 Herbert Anderson as Pliny Jones
 Julie Stevens as Lois
 Harry Shannon as Lt. Sullivan
 Mary Gordon as Mrs. Sullivan
 William Gould as Capt. Henderson
 John Hamilton as Chief Ferris
 Edgar Buchanan as Cousin Andy
 Dick Rich as Cousin Pat
 William Hopper as George (as DeWolf Hopper)
 Adrian Morris as Crusty, The Hit-Man

Critical reception
In The New York Times, Bosley Crowther wrote, "Tear Gas Squad, now at the Palace, is not the sort of propaganda to inspire confidence in the guardians of the public peace, nor, for that matter, in its highly improbable plot...if the film is dubious as a tribute to the police force, it is even more so as entertainment"; while Allmovie wrote, "Tear Gas Squad manages to pack thrills, comedy, romance and songs into a neat 55-minute package."

References

External links 
 
 
 
 

1940 films
American black-and-white films
Films directed by Terry O. Morse
American drama films
1940 drama films
Warner Bros. films
1940s English-language films
1940s American films